Gordon Liu (Lau Kar-fai ); born Sin Kam-hei August 22, 1951) is a Chinese martial arts film actor and martial artist. He played the lead role of San Te in The 36th Chamber of Shaolin (1978) and its sequels, and later played two roles in Quentin Tarantino's Kill Bill films: Johnny Mo, the leader of the Crazy 88 Yakuza gang in Volume 1 (2003); and kung fu master Pai Mei in Volume 2 (2004).

Early life
Liu was born Sin Kam-hei in Guangdong Province, China on August 22, 1951, prior to his adoption into another family. He is often wrongly cited as being the adopted son of Lau Cham, and adoptive brother of directors and actors Lau Kar-leung (Liu Chia-liang) and Lau Kar-wing (Liu Chia-Yung). He was not adopted by the family but is Lau Cham's godson.

In his youth (ages 15–20), he skipped school to train in Chinese martial arts without his parents' knowledge. He trained at Lau Cham's martial arts school of Hung Gar discipline, which descended from Wong Fei-hung's grand student (father to Lau Kar Leung). Lau Cham's wife assisted in his training and due to the friendship and respect Liu felt for Lau and his wife, he took on the name Lau Ka-fai. As he grew up, he found a job as a shipping clerk to make ends meet. His interests had always been towards martial arts and he was eventually offered a role by Lau Kar-leung.

Career
Liu's first break was with Chang's Film Company (a Shaw Brothers subsidiary operating in Taiwan) acting small parts for such films as 5 Shaolin Masters, Shaolin Martial Arts, and 4 Assassins. He starred in Challenge of the Masters (1976), as the folk hero Wong Fei Hung, and was featured in Executioners From Shaolin (1977) before starring in his signature role as Shaolin hero San Te in The 36th Chamber of Shaolin.

The tale of the imperialistic struggle, while not a new one, was significant for the intense focus placed on the inner workings of Shaolin Temple itself. San Te, Liu's character, overcomes the temple's thirty-five chambers as he unwittingly undergoes the rigorous training regimen imposed by the temple's Head Abbott on the pretext of "earning" a right to study martial arts there.

The "zero-to-hero" tale turned Liu into an international icon in spite of a frame far slighter than that of the folk hero himself (known as "Iron Arms" for the muscularity of his physique) and paved the way for a very healthy working schedule into the mid-1990s, even as younger, more agile martial artists eventually emerged. By the late 1980s, he had begun accepting smaller roles, such as in Lau Kar-leung's Tiger on the Beat.

Liu has also been active in television, and was contracted to Hong Kong's TVB company for many years, continuing playing roles as a martial arts master. Though still performing some martial arts roles, he is at home as well in comedic, self-deprecatory or emotional characters. His second-most common role in TVB has been playing a Hong Kong Police Force officer.

Quentin Tarantino had long been a fan of Liu, and hoped to find him a role in one of his movies. This eventually came to pass with the roles of Johnny Mo and Master Pai Mei in Tarantino's Kill Bill films. His roles in Kill Bill raised Liu's profile again and a renewed interest was shown by Chinese producers; since Kill Bill, Liu has returned to doing movies while continuing to do television for Hong Kong's TVB station.

In 2008, Liu added a Bollywood film to his profile. Collaborating with Indian actor Akshay Kumar who is a top-billed Bollywood actor and also a martial arts performer in a film titled Chandni Chowk To China (CC2C). He played the role of the villain, Hojo, a smuggler and a well-trained martial artist. Before this, he appeared as himself (along with his mentor Lau Kar Leung) in the 2009 film Dragonland, the first Italian documentary about martial cinema history, by Lorenzo De Luca. Liu attended as special guest star at the premiere in Rome, meeting his Italian fans for the first time. During August 2011, Liu had a stroke and put all his plans on hold to recover. Liu had cancelled all public engagements as of March 2012.

Personal life
Liu has been married twice. He has two daughters, Angie and Bonnie, from his first marriage which ended in 1986, and a son Kris and daughter Sonia from his second marriage with Ma Fei-feng of Thai-descent which ended in 2009.

In August 2011, while in To Kwa Wan performing with his band, Liu had a stroke and hit his head. He had partial right-sided paralysis and a speech impairment as a consequence of the stroke, needing a wheelchair to travel. At the same time, his estranged family from his second marriage had begun pressuring him for money. Depressed at his physical state and family complications, he isolated himself in a nursing home. In June 2012, Liu decided to divorce his second wife and focus on his recovery.

During his medical crisis, Liu entrusted his assets to his assistant and spokesperson, Eva Fung. However, the two fell out, and Fung refused to return his assets. Subsequently in 2013, he arranged for Hong Kong actress Amy Fan to become the legal guardian of his assets. Liu later took legal action to recover his assets, and on April 29, 2014, a day before the court date, Fung agreed to return them with interest. In 2015, it was reported that he no longer spoke with a slur but continued to use a wheelchair, and that he had resided at a nursing home for several years.

Filmography

Film

Television

Documentaries

See also
List of Shaw Brothers films
Shaw Brothers Studio

References

External links

Gordon Liu at Hong Kong Cinemagic
Gordon Liu at Love HK Film
Gordon Liu Biography at Hong Kong Cinema

1955 births
Living people
Chinese Hung Gar practitioners
Hong Kong martial artists
Hong Kong male film actors
Shaw Brothers Studio
Sportspeople from Guangdong
Male actors from Guangdong
Chinese male film actors
Hong Kong male television actors
Chinese male television actors